Crenicichla semifasciata is a species of cichlid native to South America. It is found in the Paraná River basin, in the Paraguay River in Paraguay and Brazil, and the Paraná drainage in Argentina.

References

johanna
Fish of Bolivia
Freshwater fish of Brazil
Fish of Paraguay
Fish of Argentina
Fish of the Amazon basin
Fish described in 1840
Taxa named by Johann Jakob Heckel